Séez may refer to:

Séez, Savoie
Sées, Orne
Roman Catholic Diocese of Séez